Prislop may refer to:


Romania

Villages 
 , a village in Cornereva Commune, Caraș-Severin County
 , a village in Dalboșeț Commune, Caraș-Severin County
 , a village in Boiu Mare Commune, Maramureș County
 , a village in Rășinari Commune, Sibiu County
 Prislop, the former name of Liviu Rebreanu village in Năsăud town, Bistrița-Năsăud County

Other locations in Romania 
 Prislop (river), a tributary of the Doftana in Prahova County
 Prislop Pass
 , a 16th-century monastery in Hunedoara County
 Prislop, a tributary of the Lăpuș in Maramureș County

Slovakia
Príslop, in Snina District